The Hollow Man (2011) is a novel by British author Oliver Harris, the first of a series featuring detective Nick Belsey.

References

External links
 The Hollow Man at West End Lane Books
 The Hollow Man at CrimeSquad.com

2011 British novels
Jonathan Cape books